The Pennsylvania State Game Lands Number 33 are Pennsylvania State Game Lands in Centre County in Pennsylvania in the United States providing hunting, bird watching, and other activities.

Geography
State Game Lands Number 33 is located in Rush, Taylor and Worth Townships in Centre County. Nearby communities include the Boroughs of Philipsburg and Chester Hill, census-designated places Hawk Run, North Philipsburg, Sandy Ridge and South Philipsburg, as well as unincorporated communities Bald Eagle, Coaldale, Cuba Mines, Edendale, Flat Rock, Gardner, Gearhartville, Glass City, Hudson, Loch Lomond Junction, New Liberty, New Town, Penn Five, Pleasant Hill, Spike Island, Stumptown, Troy and Victor.

Highways passing nearby or through SGL 33 include Interstate 99, U.S. Routes 220 and 322, as well as Pennsylvania Routes 53, 153, 350, 504, 550 and 970.

Sandy Ridge (summit elevation ) runs along the southeast border of SGL33, Pine Hill (summit elevation ) is in the northeast portion, other landforms include Cabbage Hollow, Crows Nest Hollow, Horse Hollow, Pool Hollow.

The watershed of the southeast porion of SGL 33 includes Big Fill Run, Bright Run, Laurel Run, Reese Hollow Run, Sparrow Run, Vanscoyoc Run and Wold Run all which drain to Bald Eagle Creek, Little Juniata River and Juniata River. The northeast portion includes Black Bear Run, Cabbage Hollow Run, Cold Stream, Hawk Run, Sixmile Run, Tomtit Run and Trout Run, all which drain to Moshannon Creek and the West Branch Susquehanna River. All are part of the Susquehanna River watershed.

Protected areas in Pennsylvania within 30 miles of SGL 33 include:

State Parks 
Black Moshannon State Park
Canoe Creek State Park
Greenwood Furnace State Park
Prince Gallitzin State Park
S. B. Elliott State Park
Whipple Dam State Park

State Forests 
Bald Eagle State Forest
Rothrock State Forest
Sproul State Forest

Recreational Areas 
Stone Valley Recreation Area

Pennsylvania State Game Lands 
Pennsylvania State Game Lands Number 34
Pennsylvania State Game Lands Number 60
Pennsylvania State Game Lands Number 78
Pennsylvania State Game Lands Number 87
Pennsylvania State Game Lands Number 90
Pennsylvania State Game Lands Number 92
Pennsylvania State Game Lands Number 94
Pennsylvania State Game Lands Number 98
Pennsylvania State Game Lands Number 100
Pennsylvania State Game Lands Number 103
Pennsylvania State Game Lands Number 108
Pennsylvania State Game Lands Number 112
Pennsylvania State Game Lands Number 118
Pennsylvania State Game Lands Number 120
Pennsylvania State Game Lands Number 131
Pennsylvania State Game Lands Number 147
Pennsylvania State Game Lands Number 158
Pennsylvania State Game Lands Number 166
Pennsylvania State Game Lands Number 176
Pennsylvania State Game Lands Number 184
Pennsylvania State Game Lands Number 198
Pennsylvania State Game Lands Number 278
Pennsylvania State Game Lands Number 321
Pennsylvania State Game Lands Number 322
Pennsylvania State Game Lands Number 323
Pennsylvania State Game Lands Number 333

Statistics

Biology
The most prevalent game species include bear (Ursus americanus), deer (Odocoileus virginianus), Ruffed grouse (Bonasa umbellus) and turkey (Meleagris vison).

See also
Pennsylvania State Game Lands

References

033
Protected areas of Centre County, Pennsylvania